Aurora (stylized in all lowercase) is the second studio album by American singer Bea Miller. It was released on February 23, 2018, by Hollywood Records. It's Miller's first album to be released internationally. It was preceded by three EPs, labeled as "chapters" which teased the release of a full-length album. The EPs were named after the primary colors; blue, red and yellow, each one including three songs. All of them along with five new songs were included in the final track listing.

Singles 
The first track "Song Like You" was released as the first single of Chapter One: Blue and was sent to mainstream radio on March 14, 2017. She made her first career late-night talk show performance with the song on March 30, 2017 at The Late Late Show with James Corden.

"S.L.U.T." was released as the official second single to promote the album. Miller performed the song on MTV's TRL on February 12, 2018.

Track listing
Credits taken from Tidal and Qobuz.

Notes
"I Can't Breathe" includes background vocals by Gladius.
"Buy Me Diamonds" includes background vocals by Steph Jones.
"Outside" includes background vocals by Lostboycrow.
"Girlfriend" includes background vocals by Cara Salimando.
"S.L.U.T." includes background vocals by Steph Jones and Ido Zmishlany.
All track titles are stylized in all lowercase letters, except "S.L.U.T.".

Release history

References

2018 albums
Hollywood Records albums
Bea Miller albums